Milorad Petrović (1865 – 1928) was one of the most prominent Serbian stage performers of the late 19th and early 20th centuries. He played the role of Karađorđe in The Life and Deeds of the Immortal Leader Karađorđe, the first feature film produced in Serbia and the Balkans, which was released in 1911. He died in Skopje in 1928.

References

External links
 

1865 births
1928 deaths
Serbian male film actors
Serbian male stage actors